The 2005 Vuelta a Castilla y León was the 20th edition of the Vuelta a Castilla y León cycle race and was held on 27 April to 1 May 2005. The race started in Astorga and finished in La Covatilla. The race was won by Carlos García Quesada.

Teams
Twenty-three teams of up to eight riders started the race:

 
 
 
 
 
 
 
 
 
 
 
 
 
 
 
 
 
 
 
 
 
 
 Kaiku

General classification

References

Vuelta a Castilla y León
Vuelta a Castilla y León by year
2005 in Spanish sport